Giovanni Aguilar (born March 8, 1998) is an American soccer player who plays as a midfielder for Whitecaps FC 2 of the MLS Next Pro.

Career

Youth 
Aguilar attended high school at Lindhurst High School in Olivehurst, California, where he was a three-time All-League selection, and was named high school MVP as a junior. In 2015, he joined the Sacramento Republic academy for their inaugural season, after previously playing with local side Davis Legacy. With Sacramento, Aguilar earned U.S. Development Academy Best XI honors in the Western Conference region in 2015.

College 
In 2017, Aguilar attended California State University, Northridge to play college soccer. In four seasons with the Matadors, Aguilar made 72 appearances, scoring three goals and tallying eleven assists. In his freshman year he was named Big West Conference All-Freshman Team and in his senior year was Big West First Team All-Conference.

While at college, Aguilar spent time with USL League Two side FC Golden State Force, making two regular season appearances during their 2019 season.

Professional 
On December 10, 2021, it was announced that Aguilar had signed with his former academy side Sacramento Republic ahead of their 2022 USL Championship season. On January 11, 2022, Aguilar was selected 49th overall in the 2022 MLS SuperDraft by Vancouver Whitecaps FC. A week later, Aguilar joined Vancouver for their preseason training camp. On March 18, 2022, it was announced that Aguilar had been transferred from Sacramento to Vancouver, where he'd opted to join the club's MLS Next Pro side Whitecaps FC 2. In his debut professional season, he made 22 appearances and scored four goals in the MLS Next Pro.

References

1998 births
Living people
American expatriate sportspeople in Canada
American soccer players
Association football midfielders
Cal State Northridge Matadors men's soccer players
Expatriate soccer players in Canada
FC Golden State Force players
MLS Next Pro players
Sacramento Republic FC players
USL League Two players
Vancouver Whitecaps FC draft picks
Whitecaps FC 2 players